Clitocybe tarda is  a species of mushroom. It has a brownish pink cap with a smooth surface, the flesh is thin and brittle, and the cap tastes bitter. The stalk is slender and smooth. The spore print is pinkish gray. It is unknown if the species is edible, but it does not have a pleasant taste.

The caps are 2–8 cm wide, and brownish closer to the center. The pale gills usually become more decurrent with age. The stalks are 2–6 long and 3–8 mm wide, sometimes with clusters of pale tomentum. Clusters of this species can be found in areas that are used for agriculture or filled with grass.

The 1896 Report of the New York State Botanist wrote that the mushroom should be called Clitopilus tardus.

It resembles Clitocybe nuda and C. brunneocephala.

References

tarda
Fungi described in 1897
Taxa named by Charles Horton Peck